This is the progression of world record improvements of the 100 metres hurdles W35 division of Masters athletics.

Key

References

Masters athletics world record progressions